Nico Boje (born 20 March 1973) is a South African former cricketer who played in 43 Tests, 115 One Day Internationals and single Twenty20 International for South Africa.

Boje was a member of Africa XI team for 2005 Afro-Asia Cup. He is the first cap of Twenty20 Internationals for South Africa as well.
 
He attended Grey College in Bloemfontein. He is currently coaching the Knights cricket team in the Free State, South Africa. His brother, Eduard Boje, also played first-class cricket.

Domestic career

Northamptonshire
Boje joined English side Northamptonshire CCC for the last few weeks of the 2007 season as a replacement overseas player for Johan Van der Wath. A few days later it was announced that he would be joining the breakaway Indian Cricket League. In 2008, the captain of Northamptonshire, David Sales, resigned and Boje took over the role as captain for Northamptonshire. In that season, he scored his highest ever First class cricket score of 226*. He signed a new one-year contract on 3 September 2009 which saw him lead the club through the 2010 season.

International career
Boje's international career began in 1995 against Zimbabwe, and although he was in and out of the team due to injuries he established himself as South Africa's first choice spin bowler. Due to the amount of all-rounders in the South African team, Boje usually batted at eight or nine in the batting order, despite a first class batting average of 32 and both Test and ODI averages around 26, which was the highest for a regular number nine in Test cricket in the 2000s. However, despite the reasonably high average he never hit a Test century, although did make two ODI centuries against New Zealand in 2000–01. And also in that 6 match ODI series, he amassed 355 runs in 6 innings and broke the record for scoring the most runs in a 6 match bilateral ODI series

In December 2006, Boje announced his retirement from international cricket, effective immediately. He finished his career with exactly 100 Test wickets, the wicket of Mahela Jayawardene in his final Test brought up his milestone.

References

External links

1973 births
ACA African XI One Day International cricketers
Afrikaner people
Cricketers at the 1998 Commonwealth Games
Commonwealth Games gold medallists for South Africa
Knights cricketers
Free State cricketers
ICL World XI cricketers
Hyderabad Heroes cricketers
Living people
Nottinghamshire cricketers
Northamptonshire cricketers
Northamptonshire cricket captains
Cricketers from Bloemfontein
South African cricketers
South African cricket captains
South Africa One Day International cricketers
South Africa Test cricketers
South Africa Twenty20 International cricketers
Warriors cricketers
Cricketers at the 1999 Cricket World Cup
Cricketers at the 2003 Cricket World Cup
South African cricket coaches
Commonwealth Games medallists in cricket
Medallists at the 1998 Commonwealth Games